Valente is an Italian and Portuguese surname, and may refer to:

People
Ailen Valente (born 1996), Argentine female artistic gymnast
Alfredo Valente (photographer) (1899–1973), Italian born American photographer
Benita Valente (born 1934), American soprano
Bruno Valente (born 1982), Portuguese footballer
Caterina Valente (born 1931), Italian singer, guitarist, dancer, and actress 
Catherynne M. Valente (born 1979), American poet, novelist, and literary critic
Diogo Valente (born 1984), Portuguese footballer
Duarte Valente (born 1999), Portuguese professional footballer 
Gary Valente (born 1953), American jazz trombonist
Hugo Valente (born 1992), French racing driver
Ivan Valente (born 1946), Brazilian politician, teacher and engineer
Jennifer Valente (born 1994), American racing cyclist
John Valente (born 1995), American baseball player
José Ángel Valente (1929—2000), Spanish poet 
José Valente (born 1969), Brazilian middle-distance runner
Laura Valente, stage name of Laura Bortolotti (born 1963), Italian singer and musician
Marcos Valente (born 1994), Portuguese professional footballer
Michael Valente (1895–1976), Italian-American soldier
Miguel Valente (born 1993), Brazilian swimmer
Nicola Valente (born 1991), Italian footballer
Nuno Valente (born 1974), Portuguese footballer
Renato Valente, Italian film actor
Renée Valente (1927–2016), American film and television producer
Ricardo Valente (1991), Portuguese professional footballer
Rodolfo Valente (born 1993), Brazilian actor
Rodrigo Valente (born 2001), Portuguese professional footballer 
Saverio Valente (born 1962), Argentine former footballer 
Sergio Paulo Barbosa Valente (born 1980), Portuguese footballer known as Duda
Tony Valente (politician) (born 1981), Canadian politician
Tony Valente (artist) (born 1984), French comic artist
Valeria Valente (born 1976), Italian politician and lawyer

Fictional
Thomas Valente, Jericho character

Places
Valente, Bahia, Brazil
Valente, Mozambique

Other uses
Mercedes-Benz Valente, a model released in Australia
Sergio Valente (brand), Clothing brand
Valente Quintero (film), a 1973 Mexican film directed by Mario Hernández
Valente v R, a Supreme Court of Canada decision on protection of judicial independence

See also
Valenti (surname)

Portuguese-language surnames
Italian-language surnames